In physics, the weber (symbol: Wb) is the unit of magnetic flux in the International System of Units (SI), whose units are volt-second. A magnetic flux density of one Wb/m2 (one weber per square metre) is one tesla.

The weber is named after the German physicist Wilhelm Eduard Weber (1804–1891).

Definition 

The weber may be defined in terms of Faraday's law, which relates a changing magnetic flux through a loop to the electric field around the loop. A change in flux of one weber per second will induce an electromotive force of one volt (produce an electric potential difference of one volt across two open-circuited terminals).

Officially:
That is:

One weber is also the total magnetix flux across a surface of one square meter perpendicular to a magnetic flux density of one tesla; that is,

Expressed only in SI base units, 1 weber is:

The weber is used in the definition of the henry as 1 weber per ampere, and consequently can be expressed as the product of those units:

The weber is commonly expressed in a multitude of other units:

where

History 
In 1861, the British Association for the Advancement of Science (known as "The BA") established a committee under William Thomson (later Lord Kelvin) to study electrical units. In a February 1902 manuscript, with handwritten notes of Oliver Heaviside, Giovanni Giorgi proposed a set of rational units of electromagnetism including the weber, noting that "the product of the volt into the second has been called the weber by the B. A."

The International Electrotechnical Commission began work on terminology in 1909 and established Technical Committee 1 in 1911, its oldest established committee, "to sanction the terms and definitions used in the different electrotechnical fields and to determine the equivalence of the terms used in the different languages." 

In 1930, TC1 decided that the magnetic field strength (H) is of a different nature from the magnetic flux density (B), and took up the question of naming the units for these fields and related quantities, among them the integral of magnetic flux density.

In 1935, TC 1 recommended names for several electrical units, including the weber for the practical unit of magnetic flux (and the maxwell for the CGS unit).

Also in 1935, TC1 passed responsibility for "electric and magnetic magnitudes and units" to the new TC24.  This "led eventually to the universal adoption of the Giorgi system, which unified electromagnetic units with the MKS dimensional system of units, the whole now known simply as the SI system (Système International d'unités)."

In 1938, TC24 "recommended as a connecting link [from mechanical to electrical units] the permeability of free space with the value of μ0 = 4π H/m. This group also recognized that any one of the practical units already in use (ohm, ampere, volt, henry, farad, coulomb, and weber), could equally serve as the fourth fundamental unit. "After consultation, the ampere was adopted as the fourth unit of the Giorgi system in Paris in 1950."

Multiples  

Like other SI units, the weber can modified by adding a prefix that multiplies it by a power of 10.

Conversions 
 One maxwell (Mx), the CGS unit of magnetic flux, equals 10−8 Wb

Notes and references 

SI derived units
Units of magnetic flux